Elisabeth Halliday-Sharp (born 14 December 1978) is an American equestrian, race-car driver and commentator. She was born in San Diego, California, and currently lives in Lexington, Kentucky. Before becoming a full-time equestrian, Halliday-Sharp was the most successful female driver in the American Le Mans Series with six victories. Halliday-Sharp has stated that her ambition is to become the first woman to win the 24 Hours of Le Mans race and to earn a spot on the United States Equestrian Team.

Halliday-Sharp was scheduled to make her Olympic debut in equestrian at the 2020 Summer Olympics, but was withdrawn with less than a month to go following a minor injury to her horse.

Career

Racing
Halliday first started racing at age 16 in a 1967 Datsun 510 that she shared with her father, Don, who was a Sports Car Club of America instructor and vintage racer. When she attended the University of California, Santa Barbara, she was involved in low-level motor clubs and the Vintage Auto Association. In 2001, Halliday raced in the Kumho BMW Championship series for Mosely Motorsport in the M3 E30, and was named "Driver of the Season" in 2002. A year later, Halliday recorded one win and broke the class lap record at Croft, earning her "Driver of the Day" honors. In 2003, Halliday became the first woman to win a British GT Championship round.

In 2005, Halliday made her 24 Hours of Le Mans debut in the LMP2 class, and was leading the class until she was forced to retire eleven hours into the race due to engine problems. A year later, she finished fourth in the class. After her contract with Team Modena was terminated, Halliday raced for the Noël Del Bello Racing Team in a Courage-AER LC75, which she shared with Romain Iannetta and Vitaly Petrov. However, the team was only able to finish 198 laps at the 2007 24 Hours of Le Mans, and finished 38th.

In parallel, Halliday competed at the LMP2 class of the American Le Mans Series for Intersport Racing, finishing sixth in 2005 and vice-champion in 2006. She collected three class wins in each season, most notably at the 2005 Petit Le Mans and the 2006 12 Hours of Sebring, where she finished second overall.

Halliday had a two-year hiatus from racing to be a commentator for Eurosport covering the 24 Hours of Le Mans, as well as an expert judge at Speed's GT Academy series. She also covered the American Le Mans series for CBS Sports throughout 2007, as well as for Motors TV during their Le Mans broadcasts. Halliday has also served as a mentor and judge in the Sky One series The Race.

{{blockquote|It's a big honour for me to have been selected for the GT Academy USA expert panel alongside two legends of American motorsport, especially as we have now helped to ignite one man's future racing career. We've seen with Lucas in Europe that a talented virtual racer also has the potential to become an excellent professional driver in the real world. To step from virtual simulation to Le Mans 24 Hours in just over three years is an unbelievable achievement and one that our winner will be hoping to emulate one day. Their life is about to change forever and I'm really excited to be a part of that.|Halliday about being selected for ''GT Academys expert panel}}

In 2012, Halliday made her return to racing in the Lotus Cup UK series at Silverstone Circuit for John Danby Racing, and finished the race second after starting in last place.

At the 2014 and 2015 24 Hours of Le Mans, she worked as a pit-lane reporter for the Eurosport television network.

Equestrianism
Halliday first rode horses when she was eight years old, and went to England as a pupil of William Fox-Pitt. Halliday is an eventer. She was a member of the Fallbrook Pony Club and the Southern California Show Jumping team, which finished third in the National Pony Club Championships. Her hopes of qualifying for the United States equestrian team for the 2004 Summer Olympics were dashed when her horse got eliminated in a jumping event.

In May 2021, Halliday-Sharp and her ride Deniro Z got named to the U.S. eventing team for the Tokyo 2020 Olympic Games. She was withdrawn shortly before the Olympics after Deniro Z got sidelined through injury.

Motorsports career results

Rolex Sports Car Series

Grand Touring
(key) Bold''' – Pole Position. (Overall Finish/Class Finish).

Complete 24 Hours of Le Mans results

Equestrian career results

CCI5* results

References

External links
 
 
 

American female racing drivers
1978 births
Living people
American expatriate sportspeople in England
American female equestrians
24 Hours of Spa drivers
European Le Mans Series drivers
American Le Mans Series drivers
24 Hours of Le Mans drivers
FIA GT Championship drivers
Rolex Sports Car Series drivers
British GT Championship drivers
24 Hours of Daytona drivers
21st-century American women
Racing drivers from San Diego